"You Gets No Love" is a song by American singer Faith Evans. It was written by Evans along with Toni Coleman, Mechalie Jamison, Kameelah Williams, Chauncey Hawkins, Mechalie Jamison, Andre Wilson, and Michaelangelo Saulsberry for her third studio album Faithfully (2001), while production was helmed by Saulsberry, with Evans co-producing. The song was released as the album's leading single in July 2001 and peaked at number 28 on the US Billboard Hot 100, also reaching number eight on the Billboard Hot R&B/Hip-Hop Songs chart.

Background
"You Gets No Love" was written by Evans along with Toni Coleman, Chauncey Hawkins, Mechalie Jamison, Michaelangelo Saulsberry, Kameelah Williams, and Andre Wilson, while production was helmed by Saulsberry, with Evans co-producing. Evans considered "You Gets No Love" an unusual single choice to lead her new album based on her previous singles, telling MTV News: "The first single is unexpected, because I think I've been portrayed as a soft-spoken, turn-the-other-cheek [type]. But I'm human, I go through drama, I break."

Critical reception
BBC Music's Keysha Davis called "You Gets No Love" a "brash, bassy track" that has "Evans vocally knocking out." She found that the song marked a departure for "a woman who had previously only sung, subtle, love monologues in her trademark jazzy, ethereal style." Caroline Sullivan from The Guardian remarked that the song was one of the tougher songs on parent album Faithfully, writing that it has "Faith sneering, 'I'll tell you why you gets no love/ Because you ain't cool enough', over the lewdest horn and bass line." The Independent found that while Evans's voice "dominates proceedings," it was "buried beneath the patina of 'old skool' vinyl scratches on the groove of "You Gets No Love"."

Music video
An accompanying music video for "You Gets No Love" was directed by American filmmaker Chris Robinson and film in the Crenshaw area of South Central, Los Angeles. When asked about the clip, Evans described the visuals as "bright, colorful and fun" and recalled that "it was a lot of low riders and we're in the arcade playing the pinball game. I kind of catch my boyfriend in a funny situation [...] It's a refreshing take on Faith Evans."

Track listings

Credits and personnel 
Credits adapted from the liner notes of Faithfully and  Allmusic.

T. Michael Coleman – writer
P. Diddy – vocals
Faith Evans – co-producer, vocals, writer
Chauncey Hawkins – writer
Mechalie Jamison – writer
Brian Kraz – engineering assistant
Paul Logus – mixing

Loon – vocals
Dominick Mancuso – engineering assistant
Michaelangelo Saulsberry – backing vocals, producer, writer
Kameelah Williams – backing vocals, writer
Markus Ulibarri – recording
Andre Wilson – backing vocals, writer

Charts

Weekly charts

Year-end charts

References

2001 singles
Bad Boy Records singles
Faith Evans songs
Sean Combs songs
2000 songs
Songs written by Faith Evans
Songs written by Loon (rapper)